The Tanana Valley is a lowland region in central Alaska in the United States, on the north side of the Alaska Range, where the Tanana River emerges from the mountains. Traditional inhabitants of the valley are Tanana Athabaskans of Alaskan Athabaskans.

Climate
The region experiences great extremes of temperature during the year. During the winter months, the air is prone to stratification due to temperature inversions, leading to thick fogs. During the summer, the surrounding plains are generally boglike, and include much permafrost and many pingos.

Communities
The Tanana Valley is the most populated area of Alaska north of the Alaska Range. Its largest city is Fairbanks. Other communities include:

College
Chena Hot Springs
Eielson AFB
Ester
Fort Wainwright
Fox
Manley Hot Springs
Nenana
North Pole
Tok
Two Rivers
Pleasant Valley
Salcha

Archaeology
According to James Q. Jacobs, Tanana Valley has the earliest evidence of human occupation in Alaska.

"At least three distinct lithic complexes appear in the Alaskan archaeological record at approximately the same time, between 12,060 and 11,660 B.P. The earliest firm evidence of human occupation is in the Tanana Valley in Alaska. At the Broken Mammoth, Swan Point, Mead, and Healy Lake, Alaska sites, the oldest dates range between 12,060 BP and 11,410. These sites contain cultural remains considered ancestral to today's Alaskan Native inhabitants.

The oldest stratified sites in the Nenana Valley region date to from 11,820 to 11,010 BP.

The Mesa complex in northern Alaska dates to 11,660 BP."Kunz and Reanier 1996:502

More recently, Tanana Valley sites have been dated to pre-Clovis period, or 13,000–14,000 cal yr BP.

Sites
The Broken Mammoth site, the Swan Point Archaeological Site, and the Mead Archaeological Site are the earliest dated sites in Alaska. They are located along the Tanana River.

See also

Nenana Valley

Notes

External links
 

Landforms of Fairbanks North Star Borough, Alaska
Landforms of Southeast Fairbanks Census Area, Alaska
Landforms of Yukon–Koyukuk Census Area, Alaska
Regions of Alaska
Valleys of Alaska
Pre-Clovis archaeological sites in the Americas
Tanana Athabaskans